Arthur Herbert Fonzarelli, better known as "Fonzie" or "The Fonz", is a fictional character played by Henry Winkler in the American sitcom Happy Days (1974–1984). He was originally a secondary character, but was soon positioned as a lead character when he began surpassing the other characters in popularity. To many, Fonzie is seen as the epitome of cool and a sex symbol.

Happy Days producer and writer Bob Brunner created both Arthur Fonzarelli's "Fonzie" nickname, and the invented put-down, "Sit on it". The character was a stereotypical greaser who was frequently seen on his motorcycle, wore a leather jacket, and typified the essence of cool, in contrast to his circle of friends.

On November 8, 1980, Hanna-Barbera Productions and Paramount Television produced the ABC Saturday morning The Fonz and the Happy Days Gang animated series during the Saturday morning schedule on ABC.

Fonzie is one of only two characters (along with Howard Cunningham) to appear in all 255 episodes.

Character traits and development 

Micky Dolenz auditioned and was in the running to portray the Fonz, but the part ultimately was given to Henry Winkler.  Fonzie was originally envisioned as a tall blonde male character.

Arthur Fonzarelli was born to an Italian-American family. He and his mother were abandoned by his father when Arthur was 3, and Arthur holds few memories of his father, but deep resentment toward him for the abandonment. In the Season 6 episode "Christmas Time", a sailor delivers a Christmas present ostensibly from his father (played by Eddie Fontaine). Fonzie is resentful, but at the end of the episode he opens his father's letter explaining why he left and reads it. He also learns that the sailor was his father, who admits in the letter that he doubted he would have the courage to reveal the truth to his son. Fonzie only relents when Howard Cunningham agrees with Fonzie that his father was irresponsible and in the wrong. In a later episode, Fonzie unexpectedly meets a woman he believes is his mother in a diner. She convinces him she is not, but in the end, she looks at a picture of Fonzie she had in her possession. In the final season, Fonzie meets his half-brother 'Arte' Fonzarelli, who informs him that their father has by then died. Fonzie has mixed emotions upon hearing this, as this left so many questions about his past unanswered, but Fonzie bonded with Arte, who helped him cope. Grandma Nussbaum appears to have been a primary caregiver to Fonzie since the age of six. When he (instead of Grandma Nussbaum) moves into the Cunninghams' garage apartment—a plot development that helped precipitate his increased presence in the series—he turns his old apartment over to his grandmother. She is rarely referred to after that but she is featured in at least one later episode.

Grandma Nussbaum (and she alone) calls Fonzie "Skippy". She is also the grandmother of Fonzie's cousin Chachi Arcola (played by Scott Baio). Fonzie's devotion to her foreshadows his ongoing devotion to mother figures throughout the show, particularly to Marion Cunningham, whom Fonzie affectionately calls "Mrs. C." For example, when Marion feels her family no longer needs her, she learned the ways of the world from Fonzie, and Fonzie learned about the closeness of a tight-knit all-American family from the Cunninghams. Though at first looked down on and mistrusted (a result of his past and being a high school dropout), he eventually became accepted by the Cunninghams (his friend Richie's family), even more so after he rented an attic room over their garage. Even Richie's father, Howard ("Mr. C." to Fonzie and the most resistant to him living with them), a pillar of the community, came to regard Fonzie with affection and said "Ayyyy" when Fonzie moved into the garage.

Fonzie shares a very close relationship with his younger cousin Chachi. They often had plots in the episodes together, especially after Richie left the show. Fonzie was able to be the older brother figure that Chachi needed in his life. In having Chachi come to live and work with him, Fonzie grows too, becoming an overall better, more responsible and caring person. Fonzie serves as Chachi's best man when he marries Joanie. In the long shot at the end of Chachi and Joanie's wedding, Fonzie is the first person who comes to congratulate his younger cousin. He and Chachi embrace for several seconds. They share another hug at the end of Mr. C's toast. These are just a couple examples of Fonzie and Chachi's relationship. The last couple of seasons show how close Fonzie and Chachi really grew to be.

Fonzie seems to respect people brave enough to stand up to him, as evidenced in the episode where Richie recalls meeting Fonzie for the first time while he was a member of a gang called the Falcons.  Fonzie resented Richie at first, threatening to beat him up; but when Richie refused to back down, Fonzie told him "you got guts".  Early on, Fonzie almost invariably addressed Richie and his peers by their surnames.  Fonzie regards Richie's two closest friends, Ralph Malph and Potsie Webber, as nerds, largely because of their collective willingness to do virtually anything to fit in.  Contrary to Ralph and Potsie, Richie doesn't readily compromise his own principles and sticks to what he believes is right, and on occasion even stands up to Fonzie himself.  Because of this, Fonzie begins to admire Richie and over time grows fond of him, eventually referring to him as his best friend.

At the beginning of the series, Fonzie is a high school dropout, prompting establishment characters to view him as a rebel and bad influence. Fonzie is shown once attempting to go back to school with Richie, but he later decides it just isn't for him and drops out again. However, a few seasons later, Fonzie is secretly attending night school and ultimately earns his high school diploma. Through it all, Fonzie worked as an auto mechanic. He later became an auto mechanic instructor at Jefferson High School and finally a full-fledged teacher.

Fonzie has a very high moral code. He always treats others with respect and sticks up for those who can't defend themselves. On the other hand, he often expects others to follow his example. After Chachi accidentally burns down Arnold's, for example, Fonzie disciplines him severely for his carelessness in forgetting to shut off the kitchen grill and then tossing his apron onto the grill, even though other characters (including owner Al) understand it was just an accident.

Fonzie was consistently portrayed as being very successful with women. Very few women turned down his advances or made him nervous. While displaying somewhat of a womanizing behavior, Fonzie always treated whomever he happened to be dating with utmost respect. His success with women made him a frequent source of advice for Richie, Potsie, Ralph, and Chachi. In Season 10, Fonzie maintained a long-term relationship with a single mother (played by Linda Purl), but they would break up by the following year. Though he never married in the series, he adopted a young orphan boy named Danny Corrigan, Jr., in the final season, completing his transformation from rebel to family man.

Despite his aloofness, Fonzie had more whimsical traits, such as a devotion to the Lone Ranger, whom he excitedly meets in an episode (played by John Hart). While confident with women, he blushed whenever Marion ("Mrs. C." to Fonzie), who became like a surrogate mother to him, kissed him on the cheek. She was the only person Fonzie allowed to address him by his first name, Arthur, which she always did affectionately. Richie's sister Joanie also became attached to Fonzie; his pet name for her was "Shortcake." In one episode, when it is revealed that Fonzie had never been christened as a baby, the Cunninghams stood by him at church so that he could finally be christened.

Fonzie is able to be the big brother figure Joanie needs after Richie leaves for California. Fonzie and Joanie grow to be very close, especially in the later seasons. Fonzie gives Joanie advice about everything from boys to schoolwork. Fonzie is naturally delighted when his cousin who is also his best friend decides to marry a young woman he has grown to love as a little sister. Fonzie serves as Chachi's best man at their wedding.

Fonzie self-appointed the men's restroom at Arnold's as his "office", where he, Richie, and his friends would gather to work out developing problems. Written on the walls were phone numbers of his many girlfriends, as well as a payphone. On opening night of the newly rebuilt Arnold's (after Chachi accidentally burned the old one down), Al had a desk set up in the new men's room exclusively for Fonzie. It included a desk telephone and organized pull-down sheet of all the phone numbers Al recovered from the fire.

Fonzie's rough past earns him a great deal of respect and fear from more antagonistic characters. Throughout the series he served as defender and protector of Richie, Ralph, and Potsie whenever they were confronted by various bullies and hoodlums. Various episodes indicate that Fonzie has extensive martial arts training. Even opponents larger than he are shown to back down from confrontations. Those who do fight him never come out on top. In one episode, he compares his nerve strike knowledge to that of a woman (Katmandu) while both use Ralph as a training dummy. In subsequent episodes, he out-dueled an expert fencer and mangled a gangster's prosthetic iron hand with one fist. Meanwhile, more sympathetic characters idolize Fonzie due to his success with women and his imperturbable "cool." Despite the respect he has earned, several people still antagonized him – including Officer Kirk (Ed Peck), an overzealous police officer who sometimes (though never successfully) tried to frame Fonzie or run him out of town.

Richie is the only person in the series to have ever struck Fonzie without retaliation. In the episode "Welcome Home: Part 2" from Season 11, Fonzie finds Richie (who has just returned home from the Army) drowning his sorrows in a local bar after resigning himself to a job at the Milwaukee Journal rather than follow his dream to become a Hollywood screenwriter, largely to please his family. Richie punches Fonzie in the face after Fonzie tries to take him home, but puts Richie in a full nelson after Richie takes a second swing at him. "What, you think you're gonna do that to me a second time?" is what Fonzie says before pinning Richie to a pool table. They patch things up and Richie returns home and decides to go to California.

Fonzie has an almost magical ability to manipulate technology with just a nudge, bump or a snap of his fingers; he is shown starting a car, turning on lights, coaxing free sodas from a vending machine, making girls respond, or changing the song selection on a jukebox – occasionally pounding one with his fist and eliciting the response of a classic 1950s tune, such as the Elvis Presley song Hound Dog. Somewhat hyperbolic examples of his abilities can be seen in his dreamlike encounter with the extraterrestrial Mork, such as a form of psychokinesis or a thumb capable of resisting Mork's finger.

Fonzie thinks he is never wrong and, consequently, has trouble admitting so. He attempts to say he was wrong in the episode titled "Tell it to the Marines," which originally aired on December 16, 1975, but can only get as far as an r with an unidentifiable vowel. He also has trouble apologizing and saying "sorry" as shown in "My Fair Fonzie," which originally aired on November 22, 1977. This feature of his personality was parodied by Winkler's character in Children's Hospital, an administrator who cannot admit he was wrong about a decision. (The staff assumes he is having a seizure.)

One of Fonzie's few soft spots was for his beloved iconic motorcycle. Without it, he feels uncool, as shown in the season 3 episode, "The Motorcycle", when Ralph Malph accidentally destroyed it with his car. When Mr. Cunningham told Fonzie, "it's just a motorcycle", Fonzie responded that it's what made him cool when nothing else worked.

During the episode when Fonzie jumped the shark tank on the visit to California, it is revealed that sharks are just one of his fears; the other was liver, as seen in Episode 135, "The Muckrakers", in 1975.

Civic involvement 
Fonzie was involved with community projects. He endorses Republican Dwight D. Eisenhower's 1956 presidential campaign. At a rally Fonzie declares, "Ayyy, he won the war, didn't he!?" and "I like Ike! My bike likes Ike! Ayyy..." Eisenhower carried Wisconsin with 62% of the vote, easily defeating Adlai Stevenson (supported by Richie Cunningham's more-researched speech). In that election, Eisenhower got 457 electoral votes to 73 for Stevenson.

Fonzie becomes involved with other issues. Highlighting actor Henry Winkler's off-camera work, several episodes dealt with civil rights of people with disabilities. Concerned that students with epilepsy were denied their chance to attend public school and play sports, he intervenes to resolve the issue; he also learns sign language to communicate with a woman working at the municipal power company. And he pushes Chachi to continue working with his disability when Chachi himself just wants to quit because things will be hard. Such advocacy builds on the previous season's episode where Fonzie hired wheelchair-using Don King to work in his garage, promising to provide workplace accommodation for his employee.

Concerned about equal opportunity, Fonz wants Milwaukee racially integrated. Personally friends with African Americans, he becomes upset when a party in which Richie welcomes Hawaii into the Union is boycotted because it will be racially integrated. Initially wanting to force people to attend, Fonzie learns from Howard that people cannot be forced to change their minds overnight. In a later episode, Fonzie volunteers to go south with Al and a group of Freedom Riders to help integrate a segregated diner. Normally flirtatious with women, Fonzie is instead disgusted that the waitress does not serve black customers. At one point he tells her that he cannot date her because of her compliance with the diner policy. Another episode that dealt with racial issues was where Fonzie was a juror in a trial of a black biker accused of robbery. The episode dealt with circumstantial evidence and jury nullification. Mr. Cunningham, who was on the same jury, went to bat for Fonzie, saying all jurors are permitted to present arguments and he took it very seriously about taking a man's freedom away, which he refused to do without proof of guilt. The episode was based on Twelve Angry Men. Fonzie was able to get the black biker acquitted, explaining that his English-made Triumph Grand Mark 2 had its accelerators on the left handlebar. The robber had snatched the purse of the woman with his left hand. Therefore, there is no way that the black biker could have sped off on his bike if the purse was in his left hand.

Legacy 

Winkler received three Primetime Emmy nominations and two Golden Globe awards for his portrayal of Fonzie. In addition, the  National Museum of American History, Smithsonian Institution asked him to donate one of Fonzie's leather jackets in 1980. The Smithsonian curator Eric Jentsch added the following to the jacket description: "Fonzie was a representation of cool at a time when you were learning about what cool was." Years later, NPR would make a similar assessment, stating that for "kids growing up in the 1970s, there was one, absolute model of cool — not James Dean or Marlon Brando, but The Fonz."  In 1999 TV Guide ranked Fonzie as number 4 on its 50 Greatest TV Characters of All Time list. In a 2001 poll conducted by Channel 4 in the UK, the Fonz was ranked 13th on their list of the 100 Greatest TV Characters. A few decades later, American artist Gerald P. Sawyer, unveiled the Bronze Fonz (a public artwork) on the Milwaukee Riverwalk in downtown Milwaukee, Wisconsin, on August 18, 2008. In 2021, when asked which books influenced him in childhood, American journalist Anderson Cooper (who is also dyslexic) responded that, "I also loved the Fonz and read a book when I was around 8 called The Fonz: The Henry Winkler Story. I actually keep it in my office at CNN. Henry Winkler was very important to me when I was a child. Meeting him as an adult — and discovering what a kind and gracious person he is — was amazing."

Winkler feared being typecast as a greaser after playing Fonzie (and for his previous role as a greaser in The Lords of Flatbush before Happy Days); to avoid this, he turned down the role of Danny Zuko in Grease. He nonetheless had difficulty finding work in the 1980s after Happy Days ended because of his association with the Fonzie role; he would work mainly behind the camera in the 1980s and eventually begin getting other roles in the 1990s, prompting a career rejuvenation.

In popular culture 
"The Fonz Dance" (Happy Days, Season 4, Episode 8) refers to Winkler improvising a version of the hora as Richie's band plays the song Hava Nagila. Years later in 2018, Winkler performed a version of the dance as a guest on The Tonight Show Starring Jimmy Fallon.
In season 5 of the sitcom Friends, the doctor who delivers Phoebe's triplets is a fan of Fonzie, which annoys her.
In the 1994 film "Pulp Fiction" the character Jules (Samuel L. Jackson) calms would-be robber "Honey Bunny" (Amanda Plummer) by instructing her to "Be like Fonzie" ("That's right, we're all gonna be cool!")
2019 it was reported that Dominic Cummings, special political adviser to British Prime Minister Boris Johnson, paraphrased Jules by telling Conservative MPs to "be cool like Fonzies" as political pressure built to request an extension to the date of the UK's withdrawal from the European Union.
In the 2015 sci-fi film The Martian, the character Mark Watney poses as the Fonz for his first official "proof of life" picture.
Jon Hein developed the phrase "jumping the shark"  in response to Season Five, Episode 3, "Hollywood: Part 3" of the sitcom Happy Days, in which Fonzie jumps over a shark while on water-skis.
Fonzie had the ability of hitting electrical equipment to make it work, and this became known as the Fonzie touch, a term that is still in use today.
A garage apartment is sometimes called a Fonzie flat.

See also 

Bronze Fonz
Fonzie (band) – Punk rock band from Portugal
Fonz (video game)
List of breakout characters

References 

Fictional characters from Milwaukee
Television characters introduced in 1974
Fictional mechanics
Happy Days characters
Fictional Italian American people
Fictional gang members
Teenage characters in television
American male characters in television